There are 67 counties in the state of Florida. It became a territory of the U.S. in 1821 with two counties complementing the provincial divisions retained as a Spanish territory: Escambia to the west and St. Johns to the east, divided by the Suwannee River. All of the other counties were apportioned from these two original counties. Florida became the 27th U.S. state in 1845, and its last county was created in 1925 with the formation of Gilchrist County from a segment of Alachua County. Each county has a county seat. In Florida, county seats typically have a courthouse at a town square. Of the current 67 counties and one historic county, 31 counties have changed their county seat at least once.

History
When counties were established some counties already had towns, which were soon named county seats. Several counties upon establishment lacked population centers and did not have a county seat for a year or more. Typically during those periods without a definite county seat, county courts and other local government business was held at the residences of community leaders or at churches.

A common cause for a county seat changing is the center of population changing after a new county is created. Railroads bypassing the current county seat is another common cause for a county changing its seat. A hurricane devastating the county seat has led to three counties to change their county seats. The hurricane that made landfall in September 1843 in the Big Bend area devastated Port Leon the county seat of Wakulla County, Florida and St. Joseph the county seat of Calhoun County, Florida. The destruction left in Everglades City by Hurricane Donna in 1960 led to Collier County changing its county seat in 1962. Gulf County is the county to change its seat most recently. In 1965, it changed its county seat from Wewahitchka to Port St. Joe.

Two county seats have lost their status as a county seat and later regained it:
Newnansville was the county seat of Alachua County from 1828 to 1832. In 1832, it became the county seat of Columbia County. In 1839, it became once again the county seat of Alachua County.
Miami was the county seat of Dade County from 1844 to 1866, and then regained its status as county seat in 1899.

Five county seats have later become the county seats of other counties:
 Newnansville was the county seat of Alachua County from 1828 to 1832. In 1832, it became the county seat of Columbia County.
 Susannah at Fort Pierce was the county seat of St. Lucie County (renamed Brevard County in 1855) from 1844 to 1864. When a new county named St. Lucie County was established in 1905, Fort Pierce was named the county seat.
 Lake Butler was the county seat of Bradford County, Florida from 1860 until a referendum changed the county seat to Starke, Florida on 17 August 1887. Lake Butler later became the county seat of Union County, Florida when it was established in 1921.
 Pine Level was the county seat of Manatee County from 1866 to 1887. When DeSoto County was created in 1887, it was named the county seat of the newly created county. It remained the county seat of DeSoto County until 1889.
 Enterprise was the county seat of Orange County from 1843 to 1846. It later became the county seat of Volusia upon its creation in 1854, until it was replaced in 1888.

County seat listing

See also
List of counties in Florida

References

County seats
Florida counties